Nirvana are an English pop rock band formed in London in 1966. Though the band achieved only limited commercial success, they were acclaimed both by music industry professionals and by critics. In 1985, the band reformed. The members of the band sued the American band Nirvana over the usage of the name, reaching an out-of-court settlement.

History

1966–1971: Early years
Nirvana was created as the performing arm of the London-based songwriting partnership of Irish musician Patrick Campbell-Lyons and Greek composer Alex Spyropoulos (born 1941, Athens) and English producer Ray Singer (born 1946). On their recordings Campbell-Lyons, Ray Singer and Spyropoulos supplied all the vocals. The instrumental work was primarily undertaken by top session musicians and orchestral musicians – with Campbell-Lyons providing a little guitar and Spyropoulos contributing some keyboards.

Musically, Campbell-Lyons and Spyropoulos blended myriad musical styles including rock, pop, folk, jazz, Latin rhythms and classical music, primarily augmented by baroque chamber-style arrangements to create a unique sound.

In October 1967, they released their first album: a concept album produced by Chris Blackwell titled The Story of Simon Simopath. The album was one of the first narrative concept albums ever released, predating story-driven concept albums such as the Pretty Things' S.F. Sorrow (December 1968), the Who's Tommy (April 1969) and the Kinks' Arthur (September 1969), and the Moody Blues album Days of Future Passed (November 1967) by a month.

Island Records launched Nirvana's first album "with a live show at the Saville Theatre, sharing a bill with fellow label acts Traffic, Spooky Tooth, and Jackie Edwards."

Unable to perform their songs live as a duo and with the impending release of their first album, Campbell-Lyons and Spyropoulos decided to create a live performing ensemble, the Nirvana Ensemble, and recruited four musicians to enable them to undertake concerts and TV appearances. Though hired to be part of the live performance group rather than as band members, these four musicians were also included in the photograph alongside the core duo on the album cover of their first album to assist in projecting an image of a group rather than a duo. However, they were not core founding members of the group, and within a few months Nirvana had reverted to its original two-person lineup. The four musicians who augmented Campbell-Lyons and Spyropoulos on their live appearances and television shows for those few months were Ray Singer (guitar), Brian Henderson (bass), Sylvia A. Schuster (cello) and Michael Coe (French horn, viola). Sue & Sunny also participated in the Nirvana Ensemble, providing vocals. 

The band appeared on French television with Salvador Dalí, who splashed black paint on them during a performance of their third single "Rainbow Chaser". Campbell-Lyons kept the jacket, but regrets that Dalí did not sign any of their paint-splashed clothes. Island Records allegedly sent the artist an invoice for the cleaning of Schuster's cello.

Following the minor chart success of "Rainbow Chaser", "live appearances became increasingly rare" and the songwriting duo at the core of Nirvana "decided to disband the sextet" and to rely on session musicians for future recordings. Spyropoulos cited Schuster's departure due to pregnancy as the instigator for the band returning to its core membership. Campbell-Lyons also cited the high cost of having the additional members as a reason for their departure. Schuster later became principal cellist of the BBC Symphony Orchestra.

In 1968, Nirvana recorded their second album, All of Us, which featured a similar broad range of musical styles as their first album. After the release of the album, Ray Singer left the group to produce Peter Sarstedt.

Their third album, Black Flower, was rejected by Blackwell, who compared it disparagingly to Francis Lai's A Man and a Woman. Under the title, To Markos III (supposedly named for a "rich uncle" of Spyropoulos who helped finance the album), it was released in the UK on the Pye label in May 1970, though reportedly only 250 copies were pressed it was deleted shortly after. One track, "Christopher Lucifer", was a jibe at Blackwell.

In 1971 the duo amicably separated, with Campbell-Lyons the primary contributor to the next two Nirvana albums, Local Anaesthetic 1971, and Songs of Love And Praise 1972, the latter featuring the return of Sylvia Schuster. Campbell-Lyons subsequently worked as a solo artist and issued further albums: Me and My Friend, 1973, The Electric Plough, 1981, and The Hero I Might Have Been, 1983, though these did not have commercial success.

1985–present
The duo reunited in 1985, touring Europe and releasing a compilation album Black Flower (Bam-Caruso, 1987) which contained some new material. (Black Flower had been the original planned title of their third album). In the 1990s two further albums were released. Secret Theatre 1994 compiled rare tracks and demos, while Orange and Blue 1996 contained previously unreleased material including a flower-power cover of the song "Lithium" originally recorded by the Seattle grunge band of the same name, Nirvana. According to the band's official website, this was intended as part of a tongue-in-cheek album called Nirvana Sings Nirvana that was aborted when lead singer Kurt Cobain died. When the recording was presented on the Orange and Blue album, Campbell-Lyons's liner notes treated it seriously and with allusion to Heathcliff from Wuthering Heights. Also according to the website, the band still wanted to open for Hole even after Cobain's death.

The original group filed a lawsuit in California against the Seattle grunge band in 1992. The matter was settled out of court on undisclosed terms that apparently allowed both bands to continue using the name and issuing new recordings without any packaging disclaimers or caveats to distinguish one Nirvana from the other. Music writer Everett True has claimed that Cobain's record label paid $100,000 to the original Nirvana to permit Cobain's band continued use of the name.

In 1999, they released a three-disc CD anthology titled Chemistry, including twelve previously unreleased tracks and some new material. Their first three albums were reissued on CD by Universal Records in 2003 and received critical acclaim. In 2005, Universal (Japan) reissued Local Anaesthetic and Songs of Love And Praise.

In 2018, a new album was released on the Island label Rainbow Chaser: The 60s Recordings (The Island Years), which featured the first two albums in a double CD package, featuring 52 tracks with 27 previously unreleased outtakes, demos and alternative versions.

Musical styles and techniques
The group were in the school of baroque-flavoured, melodic pop-rock music typified by the Beach Boys of Pet Sounds and God Only Knows, the Zombies of Odessey and Oracle and Time of the Season, the Procol Harum of A Whiter Shade of Pale, the Moody Blues of Days of Future Passed and Nights in White Satin and the Kinks of Waterloo Sunset and the Love of Forever Changes. The majority of the tracks on Nirvana's albums fell into that broad genre of contemporary popular music, not easily categorized but perhaps best described as the baroque or chamber strand of progressive rock, soft rock or orchestral pop and chamber pop.

The Nirvana song "Rainbow Chaser" is thought to be the first-ever British recording to feature the audio effect known as phasing or flanging throughout an entire track, as distinct from occasionally within a song such as the Small Faces in "Itchycoo Park". Phasing was, by 1967, heavily identified with the musical style known as psychedelia, and as "Rainbow Chaser" was the only Nirvana single to achieve commercial success, peaking at number 34 in UK Singles Chart during May 1968, they were invariably tagged as a "psychedelic" band. "Rainbow Chaser" was one of the few Nirvana recordings that had any connection with "psychedelic" music. "Orange and Blue", though, was acknowledged to have been written under the influence of LSD according to the liner notes of the eponymous album.

Notable collaborators
A who's-who of behind-the-scenes craftsmen, who went on to become Britain's top producers, arrangers, engineers and mixers of the 1970s, chose to work with Nirvana in the late 1960s and in essence cut their studio teeth working with Nirvana. Two of these arranger/producers actually worked with Nirvana before working with the Beatles and the Rolling Stones.

Nirvana's producers, arrangers, engineers and mixers included:
Chris Blackwell, Island Records' founder who produced the band before hitting his production stride in the 1970s with Bob Marley
Tony Visconti, Arranger/producer, before he worked with David Bowie, Marc Bolan, the Moody Blues and U2, among others
Mike Vickers, former Manfred Mann multi-instrumentalist, who undertook arrangement work for Nirvana in 1967 and 1968
Jimmy Miller, the US-born producer, who worked with them immediately before starting his five-album streak producing the Rolling Stones, including the Beggars Banquet, Exile On Main Street and Goats Head Soup albums.
Chris Thomas, the producer, whose credits include the Beatles, Procol Harum, Roxy Music, Pink Floyd (mixed The Dark Side of the Moon), the Sex Pistols and INXS.
Guy Stevens, A&R executive and producer, before his production work with Mott the Hoople.
Brian Humphries, the recording engineer, who started engineering Nirvana before going on to work with Traffic, Black Sabbath, McDonald and Giles and Pink Floyd (eventually engineering their acclaimed Wish You Were Here and Animals albums).
Mike Weighell, Nova Studios, beginning of the 1970s.

Others who worked on production with Nirvana include Muff Winwood (formerly of the Spencer Davis Group); arranger/producer Mike Hurst who worked with Jimmy Page, Cat Stevens, Manfred Mann, Spencer Davis Group and Colin Blunstone; arranger Johnny Scott who arranged for the Hollies and subsequently scored films such as The Shooting Party and Greystoke.

Top musicians who played on Nirvana sessions include: Lesley Duncan, Big Jim Sullivan, Herbie Flowers, Billy Bremner (later of Rockpile/Dave Edmunds fame), Luther Grosvenor, Clem Cattini and the full lineup of rock band Spooky Tooth, Pete Kelly (also known as Patrick Joseph Kelly)(Keyboards) who also co-wrote the 'Modus Operandi'track on the 'Local Anaesthetic' album.

Discography

Studio albums
The Story of Simon Simopath (Island 1967)
The Existence of Chance Is Everything and Nothing Whilst the Greatest Achievement Is the Living of Life and So Say ALL OF US (Island 1968)
Dedicated to Markos III (Pye 1970) a.k.a. To Markos III a.k.a. Black Flower
Local Anaesthetic (Vertigo 1971)
Songs of Love and Praise (Philips 1972)
Me And My Friend (1974) Patrick Campbell-Lyons's first solo album, but marketed as a Nirvana album when released on CD (on which most of the tracks of Songs of Love and Praise were also included)
Orange and Blue (Edsel 1996)

Compilations
Black Flower (Bam-Caruso 1987) (LP compilation)
Travelling on a Cloud (Edsel 1992) (CD compilation)
Secret Theatre (Edsel 1994) (CD compilation of rarities and outtakes)
Chemistry (Edsel 1997) (3CD retrospective)
Forever Changing - An Introduction To (Island 2003) (CD compilation)
Cult (Burger 2012) (2LP compilation)
Rainbow Chaser: The 60s Recordings (The Island Years) (Universal 2018) (2CD compilation)

Singles
"Tiny Goddess" (July 1967) – UK No. 62
"Pentecost Hotel" (October 1967) – UK No. 56
"Rainbow Chaser" (March 1968) – UK No. 34
"Girl in the Park" (July 1968)
"All of Us" (November 1968)
"Wings of Love" (January 1969)
"Oh! What a Performance" (May 1969)
"The Picture of Dorian Gray" (September 1981)

Notes

References

External links
Electric Roulette review of Markos III

Marmalade Skies: Nirvana
Trilogy Rock: Nirvana Interview to the band in 2010
Myspace: Nirvana

English pop music groups
Psychedelic pop music groups
Baroque pop musicians
English progressive rock groups
Musical groups from London
Musical groups established in 1967
Musical groups disestablished in 1971
Musical groups reestablished in 1985
Island Records artists
Vertigo Records artists